Minyong Kim is an impersonator of Kim Jong-un, the supreme leader of North Korea. He is an undergraduate student at the University of Illinois at Urbana-Champaign.

Kim was born in Seoul, South Korea, and is currently studying business at the University of Illinois. He first enrolled at the university in 2009, then went back to South Korea for 25 months to complete mandatory military service in the Korean Air Force, and is now back at the university as a full-time student.

Capitalizing on his resemblance to Kim Jong-un, Kim decided to impersonate the North Korean leader. He put on weight, bought a black suit, and got a trapezoidal haircut to make the act more convincing. He has become very popular on the campus of the University of Illinois, with hundreds of people stopping him on the street every day to take selfies with him. His resemblance to Kim Jong-un has earned him roles in movies and commercials in South Korea. Kim says his reason for impersonating the North Korean leader on the University of Illinois campus is to make people happy.

References 

Living people
South Korean male actors
People from Seoul
Impressionists (entertainers)
Cultural depictions of Kim Jong-un
Year of birth missing (living people)